Charybdis (Charybdis) lucifera, the yellowish-brown crab, is a species of swimming crab in the family Portunidae.

The type locality of this species is Indian Ocean, probably Tranquebar. It occurs naturally in the waters around Bangladesh, Malaysia India, Singapore, Pakistan, Sri Lanka, Indonesia, Taiwan, Thailand, Australia, Italy (Invasive species), Egypt (Invasive species), Mediterranean Sea (Invasive species).

References

Portunoidea
Crustaceans described in 1798
Taxa named by Johan Christian Fabricius